A cult is a religious or social group with socially deviant or novel beliefs and practices.

Cult or cults may also refer to:

Geography
 Cult, Haute-Saône, France
 Cults, Aberdeen, a suburb of Aberdeen, Scotland
 Cults Academy, a school in Cults, Aberdeenshire
 Cults railway station, a former station near Aberdeen
 Cults, Fife, a parish in the Fife area, Scotland

Sociology and religion
 Cult (religious practice), literally the "care" owed to God or gods and to temples, shrines, or churches
 New religious movement, cult in a common modern sense
 Cult following, a group of fans who are highly dedicated to a specific work of culture
 Cargo cult, a religious practice ritually mimicking a more advanced culture
 Cult of personality, when an individual uses mass media, propaganda, or other methods, to create an idealized, heroic, and at times, worshipful image
 Imperial cult, a form of state religion in which a ruler is worshipped as a demigod or deity
 Roman imperial cult, identified emperors and some members of their families with the divinely sanctioned authority of the Roman State
 Greek hero cult, one of the most distinctive features of ancient Greek religion

Film and television
 Cult (film), a Japanese film
 Cult (TV channel), an Italian TV Channel
 The Cult (TV series), a 2009 New Zealand television drama series
 Cult (TV series), a 2013 U.S. television series
 American Horror Story: Cult, the seventh season of the FX horror anthology series American Horror Story

Music

Bands
 Cults (band), a New York-based indie pop band
 The Cult, a British rock band

Album
 Cult (Apocalyptica album), a 2000 album by cello metal band Apocalyptica
 Cult (Bayside album), 2014
 Cults (album), the 2011 debut album by the band of the same name

Other uses
 Cults (3D printing marketplace)
 Committee on Culture and Education (CULT), a committee of the European Parliament
 Cult (book), a management book by Arindam Chaudhuri

See also
 The Cult (disambiguation)
 Christian cult (disambiguation)
 Confraternities in Nigeria, also known as "campus cults"
 :Category:Cults